Kloten is a municipality in the district of Bülach in the canton of Zürich in Switzerland, and belongs to the Glatt Valley.

History
Kloten is first mentioned in 1155 as Chlotun.

Geography

It is the nearest village to Zurich Airport, and the airport terminal and much of the airfield are within the municipal boundaries.

Of this area, 34.1% is used for agricultural purposes, while 26.7% is forested. Of the rest of the land, 38.2% is settled (buildings or roads) and the remainder (1%) is non-productive (rivers, glaciers or mountains).

Demographics
, 26.8% of the population was made up of foreign nationals. Over the last 10 years the population has grown at a rate of 6.4%. Most of the population speaks German  (78.8%), with Italian being second most common ( 4.2%) and Serbo-Croatian being third ( 3.1%).

In the 2007 election the most popular party was the SVP which received 46.1% of the vote.  The next three most popular parties were the SPS (16.3%), the CSP (9.5%) and the FDP (8.7%).

The age distribution of the population is children and teenagers (0–19 years old) make up 19.2% of the population, while adults (20–64 years old) make up 68.3% and seniors (over 64 years old) make up 12.5%. In Kloten about 70.3% of the population (between age 25–64) have completed either non-mandatory upper secondary education or additional higher education (either university or a Fachhochschule).

Kloten has an unemployment rate of 3.12%.  , there were 91 people employed in the primary economic sector and about 28 businesses involved in this sector; 4,545 people are employed in the secondary sector and there are 109 businesses in this sector; 23,154 people are employed in the tertiary sector, with 888 businesses in this sector.
The historical population is given in the following table:

Services
There is one library providing books, DVDs, newspapers, etc.

Transportation
The passenger terminal of Zurich Airport lies in the west of the municipality of Kloten, and much of the rest of the airport is also within the municipal boundaries. A large amount of ground transportation infrastructure, both road and rail, serves the airport and, to a lesser extent, the rest of Kloten.

Kloten is linked with Zürich via the A51 motorway and with Bülach via the same motorway. It also lies on roads taking to many places, such as Winterthur to the east.

There are three railway stations within the municipality. The airport's railway station, Zürich Flughafen, is situated in the basement of the airport terminal, and is served by long-distance trains to cities throughout Switzerland, as well as by Zürich S-Bahn lines S2, S16 and S24 . Kloten station and Balsberg station are served by S-Bahn line S7. The west of the municipality is also served by Zürich tram routes 10 and 12, operating over the Stadtbahn Glattal light rail system. The trams serve stops at Zurich Airport, and at Balsberg station.

Parkbahn runs in the park at The Circle.

Economy
Swiss International Air Lines has an office on the property of Zurich Airport and in Kloten, consisting of the Alpha, Bravo, and Charlie buildings. Swiss World Cargo has its head office in the Alpha and Bravo buildings. Swiss Private Aviation has its head office in the Swiss complex. The corporate offices for Swissôtel are located in the Prioria Business Center on the property of Zurich Airport and in Kloten.

When Swissair existed, its head office was on the property of Zurich Airport and in Kloten.

Sport
Kloten is home to EHC Kloten of the Swiss League (SL). The team plays its home games in the 7,800-seat Swiss Arena.

Education
The Schule Kloten is the city's school system, holding primary school classes in four campuses and sekundarstufe classes in two campuses.

Primary school campuses include Dorf/Feld Primar, Hinterwelden Primar, Nägelimoos Primar, and Spitz Primar. The two secondary campuses are Nägelimoos Sekundar and Spitz Sekundar. In addition there is a Berufswahlschule and a Musikschule.

Notable people 
 Alexander Rückstuhl (born 1971) rower, competed in men's quadruple sculls at the 1992 Summer Olympics
 Damien Brunner (born 1986) professional ice hockey forward 
 Charyl Chappuis (born 1992) professional footballer, has played 20 games for Thailand
 Peter Nielsen (1967 – 2004), former air traffic controller, who was killed by Vitaly Kaloev.

Climate

References

External links

 Official website 
 

 
Cities in Switzerland
Municipalities of the canton of Zürich